Artemisia pycnocephala is a North American species of sagebrush in the sunflower family, known by the common names beach wormwood, sandhill sage, and coastal sagewort.

This plant is native to the western United States coastline extending from central Oregon to southern California.

Description
It is a leafy perennial wormwood forming clumps about 50 cm (20 inches) in height. It extends erect stems covered in dense foliage which ranges in color from light green to nearly white. The fuzzy inflorescences are studded with small lobular leaves and rounded yellowish flower buds. The plant is aromatic but much less so than are other wormwoods.

Plant community and distribution
Artemisia pycnocephala is native to Oregon's and California's Coastal Strand plant community where it enjoys rocky and sandy soil. According to The University of California @ Berkeley  and Jepson Herbaria, this plant prefers to grow under 200 m. The plant's range within the State of California stretches primarily from  Del Norte County to San Luis Obispo County, with isolated populations reported from Los Angeles and San Diego Counties.

References

External links
Calflora Database: Artemisia pycnocephala (Beach sagewort,  Coastal sagewort)
Jepson Manual eFlora (TJM2) treatment of Artemisia pycnocephala

pycnocephala
Flora of California
Flora of Oregon
Natural history of the California chaparral and woodlands
Natural history of the San Francisco Bay Area
Plants described in 1838
Flora without expected TNC conservation status